The Mac Band was an American R&B group from Flint, Michigan, formed by four brothers as the primary vocalists. They are best remembered for their 1988 hit "Roses Are Red".

Overview
The group's first album, The Mac Band featuring the McCampbell Brothers included production by Babyface and members of Atlantic Starr, and one of the tracks from the album, "Roses Are Red" reached #1 on the U.S. R&B chart and reached the Top 10 in the UK Singles Chart. Several additional singles were released from this album, with a couple of them becoming minor R&B hits.

Their second album, mostly written by Gary Taylor, was not as successful.

Charles McCampbell now runs a music studio in Duncanville, Texas.

Derrick McCampbell (D-Mac) now is the Worship Leader for "The Bridge" service at Stonebridge United Methodist Church in McKinney, Texas. He also follows his basketball passion by leading his signature D-Mac Hoops Basketball camps across the Dallas metro area.  The camps are focused on team building, basketball skills, and Christian values.

Members
Ray McCampbell - vocals, saxophone
Derrick McCampbell - vocals, flute
Charles McCampbell - vocals, guitar
Kelvin McCampbell - vocals
Ray Flippen - bass
Rodney Frazier - keyboards
Mark Harper - guitar
Sly Fuller - drums

Discography

Studio albums

Singles

References

External links
 "Mac Band" @YouTube.com.
 Album and singles discography at Discogs.

Musical groups from Michigan
Sibling musical groups
1987 establishments in Michigan